Ma Ching-chiang was a Chinese Muslim general of the Republic of China Army, who served in the 1970s. He served as Deputy Commander-in-Chief of the Combined Service Forces and an advisor of President Chiang Kai-shek.

References

External links 
Islam in Taiwan

Hui people
Chinese Muslim generals
Republic of China Army generals
Kuomintang politicians in Taiwan
Taiwanese people of Hui descent
Taiwanese Muslims
Living people
Year of birth missing (living people)